Lamiaa Alzenan (born 23 February 1991) is an Egyptian judoka. She is a bronze medalist at the African Games and a two-time medalist at the African Judo Championships.

In 2019, she won the silver medal in the women's 57 kg event at the African Judo Championships held in Cape Town, South Africa. She also won the silver medal in her event in 2018.

Achievements

References

External links 
 

Living people
1991 births
Place of birth missing (living people)
Egyptian female judoka
African Games medalists in judo
African Games bronze medalists for Egypt
Competitors at the 2019 African Games
21st-century Egyptian women